Martin Addy (FDSRCS) is emeritus professor of dentistry at the University of Bristol, where he established the clinical trials unit and the research laboratories, and where his research has focussed on oral hygiene products, tooth wear and hypersensitivity of teeth. He has been campaigning to improve oral hygiene during the COVID-19 pandemic.

Selected publications

References

External links 
Research Bristol
Researchgate
Scopus

Living people
Year of birth missing (living people)
Academics of the University of Bristol
Dental academics